Von Dohlen is a surname. Notable people with the surname include:

Lenny Von Dohlen (born 1958), American actor
Tim Von Dohlen, American politician